Timms is a surname. Notable people with the surname include: 

 Arthur Timms (1914–1970), Australian footballer 
 Brian Timms (born 1940), English cricketer
 Charles Gordon Timms (1884-1958), British Army officer and rugby player
 Chris Timms (1947–2004), New Zealand yachtsman
 Colin Timms, musicologist
 E. V. Timms (1895–1960), Australian novelist and screenwriter
 Edward Timms (1937–2018), academic
 Freddie Timms (1946–2017), Australian artist
 Gene Timms (1932–2014), American politician
 Geoffrey Timms (1903–1982), British mathematician and cryptoanalyst
 Herbert Timms (1890–1973), English cricketer
 Howard Timms (born 1944), British racewalker
 John Timms (1906–1980), English cricketer
 Ken Timms (born 1938), Australian footballer
 Mary Timms (born 1981), Nigerian model
 Matt Timms (born c. 1974), event promoter
 Michele Timms (born 1965), Australian basketballer
 Philip Timms (1874–1973), Canadian photographer
 Richard Timms (born 1986), English cricketer
 Robert Timms (archer) (born 1980), Australian archer
 Robert Timms (1908–1993), Australian entrepreneur
 Sally Timms (born 1959), British singer-songwriter
 Stephen Timms (born 1955), British politician
 Wilfrid Timms (1902–1986), English cricketer

Fictional characters:
 Tony Timms, character in Australian TV series Blue Heelers
 Richard Timms, character from Alan Bennett play and film, The History Boys.
 Reverend Timms, character in British children's TV series Postman Pat

Other:
 Timms Hill, a location in Wisconsin, US
 Timms trap, a type of animal trap
 Tübinger Internet Multimedia Server, one of the first OpenCourseWare initiatives by a major university.

See also
 Timm (disambiguation)
 Trends in International Mathematics and Science Study (TIMSS)

Patronymic surnames
Surnames from given names